Prashna Shakya is a Nepali pop singer. In 2003, Hits FM awarded her Best Pop Performance Female.

Early life and education 
Prashna Shakya was born in Dharan, Nepal. Her parents are Sumitra and Binod Shakya. She has a sister and brother. When she was a teenager, her parents wanted her to pursue sports in school. Shakya preferred music and performed at school and began taking music lessons, including studying under Dibya Khaling. She participated in a singing contest by Radio Nepal and was named a finalist.

Career
Shakya released her first album, Hi! Hello, in 1997. Her second album, Aaawaz, was released in 2003. She was awarded the title "Best Pop Performance Female" by Hits FM. 

Shakya, alongside Sumit Kadka, performed the theme song for the 2016 National Games of Nepal. In 2017, Shakya performed on behalf of the Embassy of Nepal, alongside Anand Karki, at the Pakistan National Council of Arts.

Albums
 Hi! Hello (1997)
 Aaawaz (2003)
 Udayan (2008)
 Prashna (2015)

Awards and nominations 
 Timro Sur Mero Geet 2056 BS :  Competition Winner
 Hits FM Music Award 2003 :  Best Pop Performance Female (WINNER)
 11th Yamaha Kalika FM Music Award 2071 BS : Best Pop Singer Female (WINNER)
 2nd Video Award in UAE, Abu Dhabi 2017 AD : Best Female Singer (WINNER)
 7th Musical Khabar Music Award 2075 BS : Best Modern Female Singer (WINNER)
Bindabasini Award 2075: Best Singer of the Year Female Modern (WINNER)

Personal life

Shakya married film director and singer Araj Keshav in 2009. The relationship ended in divorce in 2015.

References

External links
Interview with Prashna Shakya on Nepal Star TV 
Interview with Prashna Shakya on Indigenous Television 

People from Dharan
21st-century Nepalese women singers
Nepalese pop singers
Year of birth missing (living people)
Living people